Norbert Kleinwächter (born 22 February 1986) is a German politician. Born in Augsburg, Bavaria, he represents Alternative for Germany (AfD). Norbert Kleinwächter has served as a member of the Bundestag from the state of Brandenburg since 2017.

Life 
He became member of the bundestag after the 2017 German federal election. He is a member of the Committee on European Union Affairs.

References

External links 

  
 Bundestag biography 

1986 births
Living people
Members of the Bundestag for Brandenburg
Members of the Bundestag 2017–2021
Members of the Bundestag 2021–2025
LGBT members of the Bundestag
Members of the Bundestag for the Alternative for Germany